The Archdiocese of Zadar is a Latin Church ecclesiastical territory or archdiocese of the Catholic church in Croatia. The diocese was established in the 3rd century AD and was made an archdiocese by the Pope Anastasius IV in 1154. Today, it is not part of any ecclesiastical province of Croatia but is only Croatian archdiocese subjected directly to the Holy See.

History
Zadar (modern Croatia) has been a Roman Catholic diocese in Dalmatia since AD 381 and, since 1146, an archdiocese. Adrian IV placed the archdiocese of Zara under the jurisdiction of the Patriarchate of Grado. Its succession of bishops numbers over eighty without noteworthy interruption. Bishop Sabinianus is mentioned in the "Register" of Gregory the Great. In one of his letters Pope John VIII names St. Donatus as patron of Jadera, Zadar's former name. Archaeologists find in Zadar many traces of ecclesiastical sculpture with German characteristics dating from the migration of the Germanic tribes. Zadar was the capital of Byzantine Dalmatia, but an example of Carolingian architecture is also found there, indicating that Zadar may once have belonged to the Franks and possibly explaining a visit of Bishop Donatus to Charlemagne in Dietenhofen.

Since Zadar belonged to Venice, the bishops of Grado had exercised patriarchal jurisdiction over it. In 1276 Patriarch Ægidius summoned Archbishop John with his suffragans to the Council of Grado where they were, however, represented by deputies. Archbishop Nicholas III of Zadar was present at the synod convened by Cardinal Guido of Santa Cecilia at Padua in 1350. Twenty constitutions were published, chiefly against the civil life of the clergy and the power of the laity as used against the clergy and church property. Worthy of high respect was Ægidius of Viterbo who governed the archdiocese for two years. In the first session of the Fifth Lateran Council he said: "Homines per sacra immutari fas est non sacra perhomines" ("Man must be changed by what is holy, not what is holy by man"). He also addressed the following words to the warlike Julius II, who sought to increase the possessions of the Church:

Archbishop Godeassi attended the Synod of Vienna in 1849. Archbishop Pietro Doimo Maupas was present at the First Vatican Council.

Ordinaries

Deaneries and parishes

Gallery

See also

The church and monastery of St. Michael in Zadar - Croatia

References

External links
 

Zadar
Zadar